K9 or K-9 most commonly refers to:
 K9, the nickname of police dogs and the police dog unit itself
 Canine or Canis, a genus including dogs, wolves, coyotes, and jackals
 K9 Thunder, a 155mm self-propelled artillery used by the Republic of Korea Armed Forces

K9 or K-9 may also refer to:

Fictional dogs 
 K9 (Doctor Who), the name of several robotic canines in the British science fiction television series Doctor Who
 K-9 (Looney Tunes), a dog in the Looney Tunes cartoon series
 K9 Murphy, a mechanical dog in the Japanese television series Tokusou Sentai Dekaranger

Computing 
 AMD K9, a microprocessor
 K-9 Mail, a mail client for the Android operating system
 K9 Web Protection, a web content control software
 K9Copy, a DVD backup and authoring program for Unix-like operating systems

Entertainment 
 K-9 (film), a 1989 American film
 K-9 (film series), a film series consisting of four movies
 K-9 (TV series) a British/Australian comedy/adventure series starring the same character as featured in Doctor Who
 K9, a television station serving Boise, Idaho, now known as KNIN-TV
 Sonata in G for Keyboard and Violin, K. 9, a sonata by Wolfgang Amadeus Mozart

Military 
 HMAS K9, an Australian submarine
 K-9 (missile), a Soviet short-range air-to-air missile
 Kahr K9, a variant of the Kahr K series, a 9×19mm Parabellum semi-automatic pistol manufactured by the American company Kahr Arms
 K9 Thunder, a South Korean self-propelled howitzer
 Pusan East (K-9) Air Base, an abandoned air base in Busan, South Korea

Automotive 
 Kia K9, a full-size luxury sedan
 K-9 (Kansas highway), a state highway in Kansas, US
 BYD K9, a battery electric bus

Other 
 K9 glass, an inexpensive variety of crown glass
 K9, a children's shoe size

See also 
 Canine (disambiguation)
 Kanine (disambiguation)